The 145th Street Bridge is a four-lane swing bridge across the Harlem River in New York City, connecting 145th Street and Lenox Avenue in Manhattan with 149th Street and River Avenue in the Bronx. The bridge is operated and maintained by the New York City Department of Transportation.

Construction on the original 145th Street Bridge began on April 19, 1901, and the $2.75 million bridge was opened to traffic on August 24, 1905. The designer was Alfred Pancoast Boller. It once carried northbound New York State Route 22 and New York State Route 100. This bridge was also once named the "Lenox Avenue Bridge", though that name has fallen into disuse. 

A new swing span for the bridge was assembled in the Port of Coeymans in Coeymans, New York, in southern Albany County. The span was replaced in early November 2006.

The 145th Street Bridge carries the  bus route operated by MTA New York City Transit. Between 2000 and 2014, the bridge opened for vessels 23 times.

References

External links

NYCRoads.com: 145th Street Bridge Historic Overview
NYC DoT 145th Street Bridge

Bridges completed in 1905
Swing bridges in the United States
Road bridges in New York City
Bridges in Manhattan
Bridges in the Bronx
Bridges over the Harlem River

Pedestrian bridges in New York City
1905 establishments in New York City